Mykola Andriyovych Livytsky (7 January 1907 – 8 December 1989) was a Ukrainian politician and journalist. He was the prime minister (1957–1967) and the president of the Ukrainian People's Republic (UNR) in exile (1967–1989).

References

External links
 The Ukrainian Weekly. December 2, 1961.
 Svoboda. The Ukrainian Weekly. February 20, 1965.
 День. Микола Лівицький - президент УНР в екзилі. YurSlava — Slavik Bihun's Personal Site. January 9, 2010(ua). 

1907 births
1989 deaths
People from Zhmerynka
People from Vinnitsky Uyezd
Ukrainian people in the Russian Empire
Ukrainian politicians before 1991
Leaders of Ukraine
Prime ministers of the Ukrainian People's Republic
Presidents of the Ukrainian People's Republic
Members of the Ukrainian government in exile
Emigrants from the Russian Empire to the United States